Bosco Pérez-Pla de Alvear (born 26 September 1987) is a Spanish former field hockey player who played as a defender a total of 142 times for the Spanish national team until 2017.

At the 2016 Summer Olympics, he competed for the national team in the men's tournament.

Club career
Born in Madrid Pérez-Pla started playing for Club de Campo at the age of four. In the winter of 2013, Perez-Pla won the first Hockey India League with the Ranchi Rhinos. He left Club de Campo after the 2012–13 season to play for HGC in the Dutch Hoofdklasse. He extended his stay at HGC for one more season in March 2014. After two seasons with HGC he returned to Club de Campo. In the 2020–21 season, he was the captain of the Club de Campo team which won their first ever Spanish national title. After the championship he announced his retirement as a hockey player. This retirement was not final as on 22 August 2021 it was announced he would join Leuven in the Belgian League for one season.

Honours

International
Spain U21
EuroHockey Junior Championship: 2008

Club
Club de Campo
División de Honor: 2020–21
Copa del Rey: 2004, 2005, 2011, 2012

Ranchi Rhinos
Hockey India League: 2013

References

External links

1987 births
Living people
Field hockey players from Madrid
Spanish male field hockey players
Male field hockey defenders
2010 Men's Hockey World Cup players
2014 Men's Hockey World Cup players
Field hockey players at the 2016 Summer Olympics
Olympic field hockey players of Spain
División de Honor de Hockey Hierba players
Club de Campo Villa de Madrid players
HGC players
Men's Hoofdklasse Hockey players
Hockey India League players
Ranchi Rhinos players
KHC Leuven players
Men's Belgian Hockey League players